18493 Demoleon  is a Jupiter trojan from the Trojan camp, approximately  in diameter. It was discovered by Belgian astronomer Eric Elst at ESO's La Silla Observatory in northern Chile on 17 April 1996. The dark Jovian asteroid has a rotation period of 14.4 hours. It was named after the Trojan warrior Demoleon from Greek mythology.

Orbit and classification 

Demoleon is a dark Jovian asteroid in a 1:1 orbital resonance with Jupiter. It is located in the trailering Trojan camp at the Gas Giant's  Lagrangian point, 60° behind on its orbit . It is also a non-family asteroid of the Jovian background population. It orbits the Sun at a distance of 4.8–5.8 AU once every 12 years and 2 months (4,454 days; semi-major axis of 5.3 AU). Its orbit has an eccentricity of 0.09 and an inclination of 17° with respect to the ecliptic. The body's observation arc begins with a precovery published by the Digitized Sky Survey and taken at Palomar Observatory in November 1989, more than 6 years prior to its official discovery observation at La Silla.

Naming 

This minor planet was named from Greek mythology after the Trojan warrior Demoleon, son of Antenor (2207 Antenor), who was a counselor to King Priam. Demoleon, a valiant champion of war was killed by Achilles, whose spear struck Demoleon on the temple through his bronze-cheeked helmet, crushing the bone so that the brain inside was shed in all directions. The official naming citation was published by the Minor Planet Center on 27 May 2010.

Physical characteristics 

Demoleon is an assumed C-type asteroid, while most larger Jupiter trojans are D-types. It has a low V–I color index of 0.775 (see table below).

Rotation period 

In November 2014, a rotational lightcurve of Demoleon was obtained over a total of seven nights of photometric observations by Robert Stephens at the Center for Solar System Studies in Landers, California. Lightcurve analysis gave a rotation period of  hours with a brightness amplitude of 0.18 magnitude.

Diameter and albedo 

According to the survey carried out by the NEOWISE mission of NASA's Wide-field Infrared Survey Explorer, Demoleon measures 33.47 kilometers in diameter and its surface has an albedo of 0.083, while the Collaborative Asteroid Lightcurve Link assumes a standard albedo for a carbonaceous asteroid of 0.057 and calculates a diameter of 40.33 kilometers based on an absolute magnitude of 10.7.

Notes

References

External links 
 Asteroid Lightcurve Database (LCDB), query form (info )
 Dictionary of Minor Planet Names, Google books
 Discovery Circumstances: Numbered Minor Planets (15001)-(20000) – Minor Planet Center
 Asteroid 18493 Demoleon at the Small Bodies Data Ferret
 
 

018493
Discoveries by Eric Walter Elst
Named minor planets
19960417